Evan Armstrong (15 February 1943 – 8 July 2017) was a Scottish professional bantam/feather/super featherweight boxer of the 1960s and 1970s, who won the British Boxing Board of Control (BBBofC) Scottish Area bantamweight title, BBBofC Scottish Area featherweight title, BBBofC British featherweight title, and Commonwealth featherweight title, and was a challenger for the BBBofC British bantamweight title against Alan Rudkin, and European Boxing Union (EBU) featherweight title against José Legrá, his professional fighting weight varied from , i.e. bantamweight to , i.e. super featherweight. Armstrong had Alzheimer's disease later in life and died at the age of 74 in 2017.

References

External links

Image - Evan Armstrong

1943 births
2017 deaths
Bantamweight boxers
Featherweight boxers
Sportspeople from Ayr
Scottish male boxers
Super-featherweight boxers